1732 Heike, provisional designation , is a stony Eoan asteroid from the outer region of the asteroid belt, approximately 24 kilometers in diameter.

It was discovered on 9 March 1943, by German astronomer Karl Reinmuth at Heidelberg Observatory in southern Germany, and named after Heike Neckel, the granddaughter of astronomer Alfred Bohrmann.

Classification and orbit 

The S-type asteroid is a member of the Eos family. It orbits the Sun in the outer main-belt at a distance of 2.7–3.3 AU once every 5 years and 3 months (1,911 days). Its orbit has an eccentricity of 0.11 and an inclination of 11° with respect to the ecliptic.

Rotation period 

In October 2010, a rotational lightcurve of Heike was obtained from photometric observations at the Truman Observatory. It gave a well-defined rotation period of 4.742 hours with a brightness variation of 0.32 magnitude, superseding a previous period of 3.90 hours.

Diameter and albedo 

According to the surveys carried out by the Infrared Astronomical Satellite IRAS, the Japanese Akari satellite, and NASA's Wide-field Infrared Survey Explorer with its subsequent NEOWISE mission, the asteroid measures between 20.50 and 24.31 kilometers in diameter, and its surface has an albedo between 0.110 and 0.201. The Collaborative Asteroid Lightcurve Link derives an albedo of 0.132 and a diameter of 24.17 kilometers with an absolute magnitude of 10.9.

Naming 

This minor planet was named after Heike Neckel, granddaughter of German astronomer Alfred Bohrmann (1904–2000), who was a colleague of the discoverer at Heidelberg. The asteroid 1635 Bohrmann bears his name. The official  was published by the Minor Planet Center on 20 February 1976.

References

External links 
 Asteroid Lightcurve Database (LCDB), query form (info )
 Dictionary of Minor Planet Names, Google books
 Asteroids and comets rotation curves, CdR – Observatoire de Genève, Raoul Behrend
 Discovery Circumstances: Numbered Minor Planets (1)-(5000) – Minor Planet Center
 
 

001732
Discoveries by Karl Wilhelm Reinmuth
Named minor planets
19430309